The 2018 Super League of Malawi (known as the TNM Super League for sponsorship reasons) was the 33rd season of the Super League of Malawi, the top professional league for association football clubs in Malawi since its establishment in 1986. It started on 14 April and ended on 24 December 2018. Be Forward Wanderers FC were the defending champions of the previous season. Nyasa Big Bullets was crowned Super League champions for fourteenth time following a 3–0 win over Red Lions.

Teams 
Sixteen teams compete in this season: the top thirteen teams from the previous season and three promoted side from the regional leagues. Karonga United (Northern Regional Football League), Nchalo United (Southern Regional Football League), and TN Stars (Central Regional Football League) entered as the three promoted teams, instead of the three relegated teams from previous season, Wizards, Blantyre United and Chitipa United.

League table

References

External links
Official Website

2018
Premier League
Malawi